The House of Assembly was the legislature of the British colony of Jamaica. It held its first meeting on 20 January 1664 at Spanish Town. As a result of the Morant Bay Rebellion, the Assembly voted to abolish self-governance in 1865. Jamaica then became a direct-ruled crown colony.

Originally there were twelve districts represented.

For many years, a high property qualification ensured that the House of Assembly was dominated by the White Jamaican planter class. However, to elect these representatives, the bar was lower for "freeholders", who just had to be white men with a house, pen or plantation, and owned black slaves.

A law passed in 1840 allowed some blacks and mixed-race men to vote in elections to the Assembly, though they had to own property, so the white planters continued to dominate it.

See also
 Jamaican general elections, 1677–1863
 List of speakers of the House of Assembly of Jamaica
 Parliament of Jamaica

References

Colony of Jamaica
Historical legislatures
Politics of Jamaica
Political organisations based in Jamaica
1664 establishments in Jamaica
1865 disestablishments in Jamaica
Members of the House of Assembly of Jamaica
Speakers of the House of Assembly of Jamaica